Nashville 99 is an American crime drama series that aired for 4 episodes on CBS from April 1 to April 22, 1977. The series starred Claude Akins as Det. Lt. Stonewall Huff (badge number 99) and Jerry Reed as Det. Trace Mayne.  Supporting cast members included Lucille Benson as Birdie Huff, Charley Pride as R.B., and Dianne Sherrill as Rollie.

Overview
"Stoney" Huff – a farmer running a 200-acre spread outside Nashville – is portrayed as a tough, old school cop who plays fair, regardless of the stature of the criminal, and fights crime his own way.  Mayne, however, is seen as a redneck officer who, in an attempt at country music stardom, pitches his songs to the myriad celebrity entertainers he encounters.

Guest stars included Chet Atkins, Ned Beatty, Pat Hingle, Don Johnson, Johnny Paycheck, Jeannine Riley, Ray Stevens, Mel Tillis, Sharon Wyatt (in her first TV appearance), and Tammy Wynette.

Episodes of Nashville 99 were directed by Lawrence Dobkin, Don McDougall, and George Sherman, and written by Ron Bishop and Jimmy Sangster.  The series was produced by Frankel Productions in association with 20th Century Fox Television (with Ernie Frankel serving as Executive Producer), and featured a theme song performed and co-written by Reed.  One month later, Reed co-starred with Burt Reynolds in Smokey and the Bandit.

Cast
Claude Akins as Det. Lt. Stonewall Huff
Jerry Reed as Det. Trace Mayne
Lucille Benson as Birdie Huff
Charley Pride as R.B.

Episode list

Availability and syndication
All episodes have not been seen since their initial run. Episode prints of the show do belong in some private collections. YouTube has two of the episodes available.

External links

1977 American television series debuts
1977 American television series endings
1970s American crime drama television series
CBS original programming
Television series by 20th Century Fox Television
Television shows set in Tennessee